The mixed 4 × 400 metres relay is a 4 × 400 metres relay in which teams field two men and two women, in whatever order they choose. It was introduced at the 2017 IAAF World Relays and was then held at the 2019 World Athletics Championships in Qatar.

Background
Part of the rationale for the event is that should teams put their men and women in different orders, there will be excitement in seeing large leads being reversed when men and women are running against each other. All the teams in the finals at the 2017 IAAF World Relays ran man-woman-woman-man.  In the final of the event's World Athletics Championship debut in 2019, all but one team chose a man-woman-woman-man order, with the exception of Poland, who chose man-man-woman-woman. 

Michael Johnson commentating at the 2019 World Athletics Championships expressed a concern that, while entertaining, the mixed 4 × 400 metres event contributes to an overly busy schedule.

World record progression
The first world record recognised by the IAAF was set by the US team at 3:12.42 in the first heat at the 2019 World Athletics Championships on 28 September 2019, beating a prior world best by the US set in 2016. The US team then set a new record of 3:09.34 in the final the next day.

2019 World Athletics Championship

2020 Summer Olympics
Poland won the inaugural Olympic 4 × 400 metres mixed relay at the 2020 Summer Olympics, held in 2021.

* Indicates the athlete only competed in the preliminary heats and received medals.

References

Track relay races